Aditya is a solar-powered ferry operating between Vaikkom and Thavanakkadavu in the Indian state of Kerala. The boat was inaugurated by Kerala Chief Minister Sri. Pinarayi Vijayan and Central Cabinet Minister for Power, Renewable Energy, Sri. Piyush Goyal on 12 January 2017.

It is India's first solar-powered ferry and the largest solar-powered boat in India. The vessel was designed and built by Navalt Solar and Electric Boats in Kochi, India. Navalt is a technology joint venture firm between Navgathi Marine Design and Constructions, Alternative Energies (France) and EVE Systems (France).

In August 2020, MarineLink reported that by the end of the year the Kerala state would replace the three diesel ferries operating the same route with solar ones, mentioning that Aditya costs about US$79 per month compared to US$2867 for diesel-powered ones. In three years the Aditya has saved more than 100,000 liters of diesel. The State Water Transport Department of the Government of Kerala also decided to replace all of its 48 diesel ferries with solar ones.

Technical features 
There are 700 kg of lithium-ion batteries in the ship's two hulls with a total capacity of 50 kWh. The catamaran hull and its shape allow it to reach speeds of up to 7.5 knots. This was verified by Indian Register of Shipping surveyor, Kerala Port surveyor and technical committee. The hull was designed based on extensive experience of Navgathi and AltEn and extensive computational fluid dynamics (CFD) was done to determine its hydrodynamics. The boat is designed to be used as a passenger ferry to operate between Vaikom and Thavanakadavu.

The normal operating speed is 5.5 knots (10 km/h) to achieve a 15-minute travel time between Vaikom and Thavanakkadavu, a distance of 2.5 km on water. For achieving this speed, the power needed is about 16 kW. During maneuvering, when leaving the jetty or approaching it, about 22 kW of power is needed. Hence, on average about 20 kW power is needed. The total running time, neglecting the time in jetty for embarkation and disembarkation of passengers is 5.5 hours on a sunny day (depending on client needs).

Although the maximum power needed is a total of 22 kW during maneuvering and 16 kW under cruise, more than double the power, a total of 40 kW, is provided in two motors of 20 kW each. The two systems on either side of the boat (in each demi-hull) are electrically independent to ensure redundancy in case of system failure in one. Even if one system fails the power is available to safely cruise to shore with others. Also, unlike diesel engines, since efficiency does not drop with load, the electric motors can normally operate at 50% load and in emergencies at 100%.

For higher safety standards and reliability, the vessel is built under Indian Register of Shipping rules for inland vessels and operating conditions of the Vaikom – Thavanakkadavu route. The boat construction is complete and was tested by Technical committee, Indian Register of Shipping surveyor and Kerala Port surveyor on 16 November 2016, near in backwaters at Aroor. The boat is registered in Kodungallur Port under Kerala Ports.

The boat is remotely monitored and troubleshooting can also be done remotely. All the operating parameters of the boat are recorded and transmitted to the NavAlt Solar and Electric Boats server from where the technical experts can monitor the boat. The upgrades and settings in the software can also be performed remotely as if a computer is plugged into the boat. This makes the boat even safer.

The project cost was US$370,000.

Awards 

Winner of the First Gussies Award for the Best Electric Ferry in the World 2020 in memory of Gustave Trouvé
 Solar Impulse Foundation Efficient Solution Label as a profitable and eco-friendly solution
 Listed in the Significant Small Ships in the World 2017, by  Royal Institute of Naval Architects, UK
FICCI Best R&D Project that can be scaled up (Catapult Award) 2017

Safety features 

 The boat is a catamaran and hence more stable than single-hulled boats. The boat can safely carry 200 passengers and still meet the tough stability criteria of IMO sea-going ships.
 The propulsion battery is approved by DNV Class. These higher standards of safety are essential to ensure the risk of thermal runaway is minimal.
 The battery monitoring is on a cell level and hence risks are lower.
 There are three levels of safety warning – first being a warning that certain parameters are approaching the limit, second is the warning that limits have reached and hence need a slowdown, and finally the warning that limits have breached the upper limit and the system need to shut down to protect it. The parameters include the temperature of cells, motor, and many more.
 There is two independent power train that provides reliability and redundancy. A system fault in one power train does not affect the other since they are electrically independent. The boat satisfies the Indian Register of Shipping's safety requirement of being able to maintain cruise speed with one set of propulsion shut down.

Year 6 Statistics 
It is now six years of operation since inauguration on 12th Jan, 2017. The numbers for this total period is as follows:

No. of Passengers – 20 Lakh
 Distance Travelled – 125,000 km
 Diesel saved – 1.9 Lakh litres
 Pollution avoided – 509 tonnes , 7.1 tonnes , 1542 kg , 191 kg Particulates
 OPEX savings – 200 Lakh rupees

Year 4 Statistics 
The boat is operating since its launch on 12 January 2017 between Vaikkom and Thavanakkadavu. In the fourth year of operation, the number of days, distance travelled, passengers and therefore benefits from fuel-saving and pollution reduction were lesser due to Covid restrictions.

 No. of Passengers – 13.5 Lakh
 Distance Travelled – 80,000 km
 Diesel saved – 1.3 Lakh litres
 Pollution avoided – 330 tonnes , 4.6 tonnes , 1000 kg , 124 kg Particulates
 OPEX savings – 88 Lakh rupees

Year 3 Statistics 
The boat is operating since launch on 12 January 2017 between Vaikkom and Thavanakkadavu. The live position and operation data of the boat is available in the Kerala State Water Transport Department website – http://swtd.xship.in/aditya

 No. of Passengers – 10.6 Lakh
 Distance Travelled – 63,000 km
 Diesel saved – 1.05 Lakh litres
 Pollution avoided – 283 tonnes , 3.9 tonnes , 844 kg , 106 kg Particulates
 OPEX savings – 75 Lakh rupees

Year 2 Statistics 
On 12 January 2019, it completed two years of service. In this period the boat carried 600,000 passengers and traveled a distance of 38,000 km without a single drop of fuel thereby saving 58,000 litres of diesel. This saved almost 45 lakhs (65,000 US$) in diesel and maintenance costs.

 No. of Passengers – 6 Lakh
 Distance Travelled – 38,000 km
 Diesel saved – 58,000 litres
 OPEX savings – 45 Lakh rupees

Year 1 Statistics 
The first year of operation shows the following summary.

 Propulsion energy per day for 22 trips – 72.8 kWh
 Propulsion energy per trip – 3.3 kWh
 Battery state of charge (SOC) at end of the day – 58%
 Grid charging cost per day – 2.6 US$ (₹ 179)
OPEX savings – 25 Lakh rupees

The Government of India under the leadership of Prime Minister, Sri. Narendra Modi and the Ministry of New and Renewable Energy agreed to sponsor the project considering that this is a first of its kind in India. The benefit of sponsorship would mean that Kerala State Water Transport Department would get the boat at almost free of cost. In this scenario the boat is cheaper than the conventional boat and they would start saving money from day one. However the ministry is yet to give the subsidy amount to Kerala State Water Transport Department. Another unfulfilled demand is the equal treatment of electric boats to electric buses under FAME scheme that would have enabled 20% cost reduction in the project. NITI-Aayog is yet to remove this discrimination.

Initial Days Operation 
The first 150 days operation data shows that even rainy days during monsoon did not affect the schedule of the boat.

 Propulsion energy per day for 22 trips – 73.7 kWh
 Propulsion energy per trip – 3.5 kWh
 Battery state of charge (SOC) at end of the day – 60%
 Grid charging cost per day – 2.5 US$ (₹ 163)

The first 60 days operation data of ADITYA yielded the following results

 Propulsion energy per day for 22 trips – 73.3 kWh
 Propulsion energy per trip – 3.33 kWh
 Battery state of charge (SOC) at end of the day – 65%
 Grid charging cost per day – 1.9 US$ (₹ 124)

Test and trials 

The boat was launched on  9 November 2016. After that multiple sets of tests and trials were conducted to verify the operational characteristics and safety standards of the boat.

Optimisation Trials – to refine the settings in the internal software to ensure higher efficiency in the solar energy conversion and propulsion system, the tests was done on 13 and 14 November 2016 with the experts from France.
Builders Trials – done on 15 November 2016, to ensure the systems were functioning as per specifications.
IRS and Technical Committee Trials – done on 16 November 2016 to verify the operation, speed, safety of the boat. The maximum speed was noted as 7.4 knots @ 90% propulsive power. The power needed to move the boat at a cruise speed of 5.5 knots was 15 kW. The boat was also tested for redundancy trials by shutting down one system and checked whether using one system the boat can still move at a cruise speed of 5.5 knots. Other maneuvering tests were also done.
Client Trials – done on  25 November 2016, along with Transport Minister Sri. A. K. Saseendran, Aroor MLA Sri. A. M. Ariff, Vaikom MLA C. K. Asha. The performance was satisfactory for the dignitaries as well as the operators of the Kerala State Water Transport Department. The Transport Minister proclaimed that 14 more such ferries are planned this year.
Site Trials – done at Vaikom to Thavanakkadavu route in presence of Technical committee, IRS and Kerala Port surveyor from morning to evening. As per the specifications, 22 trips was done with a full load and it was satisfactory.

Tender specifications 
During conceptualising the project, it was envisaged that the total energy needed to operate the ferry for 5.5 hours is 110 kWh (20 kW is average power). As 1 kW solar panels produce approximately 4 kWh of energy per day, factoring the system efficiency and standard sun of the location of 5.72 (averaged throughout the year). Hence the energy from solar panels is 80 kWh. The gap in energy is provided by lithium battery that can provide up to 40 kWh (80% discharge) from a total capacity of 50 kWh. The lithium batteries are fully charged in the morning because of overnight grid charging.

A trip between the two boat points takes 15 minutes and it was estimated to need the energy of 5 kWh. Hence a total of 22 trips would be made daily transporting 1,650 people daily, or 580,000 people every year without burning fuel.

Trips on average sunny day: 7:00 AM to 7:00 PM (running hours 5.5 hours).

The below table describes the prediction for 22 trips in each column, and for each trip the start time and end time. It also lists the break time at the end of each trip. In non-peak hours this is about 15 minutes, in peak time it is 10 minutes and around noon it is two hours. The energy from the sun is cumulative at the end of the period and for an average sunny day it is about 72 kWh from 18 kW panels (the rest is for auxiliary systems and charges a different battery bank). The battery state of charge (SOC) is shown at the beginning of the trip and end of the trip. At the end of the day, the battery has about 20% charge left. The energy use can be further optimised by adding one more trip (5 kWh usage) so that end of day battery SOC can be 10%.

On a bright sunny day, the no. of trips can be increased by taking trips from 11:55 to 14:05 break. About four more trips can be made in this period.

On a cloudy day, the no. of trips is reduced and the break time is increased. If it is very cloudy during the break time, then shore charging can be done. This is a 32A charger and charges at 7 kW. Hence in the three-hour break, it can charge the battery by 21 kWh. With two upcoming landmark projects, NavAlt boats will be foraying into the fishing sector and defence industry for the first time.

See also 

 Electric boat
 Solar Impulse, a solar powered airplane
 List of solar-powered boats

References

External links 
SWTD
ADITYA live position http://swtd.xship.in/aditya

Water transport in Kerala
Renewable energy
Solar-powered vehicles
Transport in Kochi